Alistair Presnell (born 26 March 1979) is an Australian professional golfer.

Presnell was born in Melbourne, Victoria. Having won three amateur titles during 2003, he turned professional at the start of 2004 and joined both the PGA Tour of Australasia and Asian Tour

Presnell finished tied for 5th at the 2004 Australian Open during his rookie season to secure his place on the Australasian Tour, and only just retained his Asian Tour card with 60th place on the end of season money list, the last place to guarantee playing rights for the following season. In 2006, he lost his place on both tours, but managed to regain his PGA Tour of Australasia playing status though qualifying school.

Presnell won his first professional title at the 2009 PGA Tour of Australasia's Moonah Classic, which was co-sanctioned by the United States-based second tier Nationwide Tour. The win gave him exemption on both tours until the end of 2010.

By virtue of his second-place finish on the 2009 PGA Tour of Australasia's Order of Merit, he gained an exemption into the 2010 WGC-CA Championship. In not only his first World Golf Championship event, but also his first PGA Tour event, he placed a respectable tied for 6th on 10-under-par, which included a final round 8-under-par 64.

In 2010, Presnell won the Victorian PGA Championship, thanks to a final round score of 60. In doing so, he equalled the lowest score in Australasian PGA Tour history.

Presnell played in his first major at the 2012 U.S. Open. His place in the field was secured through sectional qualifying. His major debut saw him tied for second at one point on Friday afternoon. He finished the tournament at +9, tied for 29th.

Amateur wins
2003 Victorian Amateur Medal, Dunes Medal, ACT Amateur

Professional wins (2)

PGA Tour of Australasia wins (2)

1Co-sanctioned by the Nationwide Tour

Nationwide Tour wins (1)

1Co-sanctioned by the PGA Tour of Australasia

Results in major championships

"T" indicates a tie for a place
Note: Presnell only played in the U.S. Open.

Results in World Golf Championships

"T" = Tied

Team appearances
Amateur
Australian Men's Interstate Teams Matches (representing Victoria): 2013

See also
2012 Web.com Tour graduates

References

External links

Alistair Presnell player profile, Golf Australia

Australian male golfers
PGA Tour of Australasia golfers
Asian Tour golfers
PGA Tour golfers
Korn Ferry Tour graduates
Golfers from Melbourne
Sportsmen from Victoria (Australia)
1979 births
Living people